Dan Ferrone (born April 3, 1958) is a former professional Canadian football player.  He played with the Toronto Argonauts for 8 seasons, interrupted by one season with the Calgary Stampeders, in the Canadian Football League (CFL).  He was an offensive lineman with the teams from 1981 to 1992, part of the Argonaut's Grey Cup championships in 1983 and 1991.

During Ferrone's time in the CFL, he was named to the CFL's All-Star team 5 times, the East Division All-Star team 8 times and one time West Division All-Star.

In 1992, his first year after retiring from the CFL, Ferrone was elected as the seventh president of the Canadian Football League Players' Association (CFLPA).  He served as CFLPA president until 2000.

Following his service with the CFLPA, Ferrone coached the Toronto Argonauts offensive line in 2002, becoming the team's Vice-President in 2003 and serving as the team's President for 2004.

The multiple All-Star and Grey Cup champion was inducted to the Canadian Football Hall of Fame in September 2013.

External links
 Dan Ferrone Profile at Oakville Sports Hall Of Fame.

1958 births
Calgary Stampeders players
Canadian Football Hall of Fame inductees
Canadian football offensive linemen
Living people
People from Oakville, Ontario
Players of Canadian football from Ontario
Simon Fraser Clan football players
Toronto Argonauts players
Toronto Argonauts team presidents